John Gurdon (3 July 1595 – 9 September 1679) was an English politician who sat in the House of Commons variously between 1640 and 1660. He supported the parliamentary cause in the English Civil War and was not returned to Parliament after the English Restoration.

Political life
Gurdon was the son of a country gentleman, Brampton Gurdon, with estates at Letton, Norfolk, and Assington, Suffolk. He was elected to the Short Parliament and then the Long Parliament in 1640 for Ipswich.

During the Civil War, he supported the Parliamentarians. Later, when internal dissension broke out among them, he supported the Army party. He remained in the House of Commons after Pride's Purge, but when named one of the Commissioners for the trial of Charles I of England, he refused to attend. Even so, he was chosen as a member of the council of State in 1650, 1651 and 1652.

After the expulsion of the Long Parliament, Gurdon sat for Suffolk in the First Protectorate Parliament (1654) and for Sudbury in the Convention Parliament of 1660. He was not re-elected after the Restoration.

Private life
Gurdon married Anne Parker, daughter of Sir Calthorpe Parker of Erwarton. His children included Philip Gurdon (c. 1630–1690), who was also an MP for Sudbury, and the Reverend Nathaniel Gurdon D. D. (died 1696), Rector of Chelmsford, who survived his brother to inherit Assington on his death.

There is a memorial to John Gurdon in the parish church of Assington, St Edmund's.

References

D. Brunton and D. H. Pennington, Members of the Long Parliament. London: George Allen & Unwin, 1954
Burke's Landed Gentry, 4th edition. London: Harrison, Pall Mall, 1862–1863

Cobbett's Parliamentary history of England, from the Norman Conquest in 1066 to the year 1803. London: Thomas Hansard, 1808 

1595 births
1679 deaths
English MPs 1640 (April)
English MPs 1640–1648
English MPs 1648–1653
English MPs 1654–1655
English MPs 1660
Members of the Parliament of England (pre-1707) for Ipswich